Kangaroo is a 1987 Australian drama film directed by Tim Burstall and starring Colin Friels, Judy Davis, and John Walton. It is based on the 1923 novel of the same name by D. H. Lawrence.

Premise
In 1922, an English writer (Colin Friels) migrates to Australia with his wife (Judy Davis). There he resists joining both a paramilitary group and a socialist group, is caught in a riot, sees a death and loses love and friendship.

Cast
Colin Friels as Richard Somers
Judy Davis as Harriet Somers
John Walton as Jack Calcott
Julie Nihill as Vicki Calcott
Hugh Keays-Byrne as Kangaroo
Peter Hehir as Jaz
Peter Cummins as Struthers
Tim Robertson as O'Neill
Malcolm Robertson as Publisher
David Hutchins as Cornwall Detective
Kerry Bannister as nurse

Production
In 1972, it was announced the novel would be filmed starring Dirk Bogarde but this did not eventuate. In 1981, Tim Burstall announced he would make the film and he had Leo McKern lined up to play Kangaroo and Bryan Brown and Olivia Newton-John to play the husband and wife.

The film was not made. He managed to do it several years later, by which time he felt McKern was too old and instead cast Hugh Keays-Byrne. He commissioned Evan Jones to adapt the script because he felt it needed an English writer.

Filming was conducted in Melbourne, Australia and went from 21 October to 14 December 1985.

Awards
The film was nominated for 2 awards in the 1986 AFI Awards and also won in the Best Achievement in Best Actress in a Lead Role (Judy Davis) and Costume Design (Terry Ryan) categories. It was entered into the 15th Moscow International Film Festival.

Home video
After the film's 1987 U.S. theatrical run, the film was released on videocassette and laserdisc by MCA Home Video. The film was released through Australia-based Umbrella Entertainment on 8 January 2010 as an all-region PAL disc.

The film is rated R13 in New Zealand.

Box office
Kangaroo grossed $68,978 at the box office in Australia.

See also
Cinema of Australia

References

Further reading

External links

Kangaroo at Oz Movies

1987 films
1987 drama films
Australian drama films
Films based on works by D. H. Lawrence
Films shot in Melbourne
Films directed by Tim Burstall
Films based on British novels
1980s English-language films